Matkot ( lit. "racquets") is a popular Padel ball game in Israel similar to beach tennis, often referred to by Israelis as their national beach sport.

History
 
Matkot has been played on the beaches of Mandatory Palestine since the 1920s. Early documentation of the game includes a 1932 Tel Aviv beach scene by Israeli artist Nahum Gutman showing two young men holding rounded paddles and hitting a ball back and forth on the beach.

The goal of the game is to hit a small rubber ball with a wooden racket as many times as possible without dropping it. Two or more players hit the ball back and forth  using paddles.

The racquets are traditionally made of wood, although sometimes the handles are reinforced with a plastic covering. Carbon fiber is also used. The head of a racquet may vary somewhat in size and shape. The racquet handles are short, and with very little trunk between the handle and the racquet head. 

The standard ball used is the same ball as is used in squash. However, novice and intermediate players sometimes use a ball that is similar in size to a squash ball, but lighter and/or bouncier.

The game has developed a moderate level of popularity outside of Israel as a participatory sport, particularly where there is either a strong beach culture (e.g. Thailand).

The first Israeli matkot competition was held in 2000, capped by a national championship in Tel Aviv.

See also

 Racquet sport
 Sport in Israel
 Israeli inventions and discoveries
 Culture of Israel

References

External links 
 How To Play Matkot
 find the best Matkot in israel

Israeli culture
Israeli games
Racket sports
Sport in Israel
Sports originating in Israel
Beach sports